Chaz Davies (born 10 February 1987 in Knighton, Powys, Wales), is a former motorcycle racer who announced his retirement from competition in September 2021. For 2022, Davies is to become a rider-coach working with Ducati and Feel Racing, mentoring Alvaro Bautista and Michael Ruben Rinaldi in World Superbikes and Nicolo Bulega in Ducati's inaugural World Supersport season, riding the Panigale V-twin.

He was the 2011 World Supersport champion and also the 2011 BBC Wales Sports Personality of the Year.

Career

Early career
Davies started racing in the British Mini Moto championship in 1995, moving up to Junior Road racing in 1999. In the same season he was given special dispensation at the age of 12 to take part in the Aprilia Challenge 125cc Championship. Davies finished 6th overall, and was the only rider to finish every race in a points scoring position. He set a new lap record at Donington Park National circuit, and was awarded 'Superteen of the Year'. He stayed with the series for a second year, and was runner up in the championship.

In 2001 Davies moved to the British 125 Championship, placing seventh after completing 8 of 13 rounds. Davies was the youngest winner of a British Championship race in July at Thruxton at the age of 14 years 5 months. Davies also contested all rounds of the Spanish National 125 Championship with the Telefonica Movistar team under the management of Alberto Puig. He was nominated for BBC "Young Sports Personality of the Year."

In 2002 management company Dorna Sports placed Chaz with Team Matteoni Racing to compete in the 125cc Grand Prix World Championship riding a kit Aprilia. Davies became the youngest rider to compete in a full season of GP Motorcycle racing.

From 2003, Davies rode for Aprilia Germany on the back of the consistent performance in his 125cc 'Rookie' season. In 2003 he became the youngest rider to score World Championship points in the 250cc class finishing 15th place in the Gauloises Africa's Grand Prix. For the 2004 season, still the youngest rider by two years, Davies finished 13th in the 250cc World Championship Classification out of the 36 regular starters scoring three top 10 results in the final three races of the season. Davies finished 2004 with a series of outstanding results on what was a customer kit level of bike, far inferior to those of the factory teams. He finished 9th in Malaysia, 6th in Australia and then backed it up with 5th at the final race in Valencia.

Davies again signed for Aprilia Germany for 2005 in hope that Aprilia would provide him with factory material after his strong end to 2004. With two Top 10 results in Italy and Turkey, Davies again proved himself a consistent front runner within the non-factory machines but again failed to secure any type of factory backing. He finished the championship in 16th.

For the 2006 season, he was promised a semi-works Aprilia bike by the Campetella team, but this did not materialise after the team ran into serious sponsorship difficulties and Davies was forced to ride a series of privateer options. After Campetella replaced Davies for the Mugello round with a sponsored rider Franco Battaini due to financial difficulties, Davies secured a semi-works Honda ride for another team the 2006 British GP at Donington Park. He then rode a 600 cc Yamaha in the AMA Championship at Mid-Ohio; then finished out the season with a 250 cc ride at the closing Grand Prix of the year at Cheste, near Valencia.

AMA
In 2007, Davies raced in the AMA Supersport Championship and Formula X-Treme Championship, racing a Yamaha for the Celtic Racing team. In 2008 he rode a Kawasaki for Attack Kawasaki. In early December 2007 Davies set the fastest times in two classes while testing at Daytona for the upcoming opening race of the 2008 AMA season. He was named winner of the 2008 Daytona 200 after original race winner, Josh Hayes, was disqualified for an illegal crankshaft. Davies becomes the first racer from the United Kingdom to win the prestigious race.

For 2009 Davies signed with KWS Aprilia to run in the all-new AMA Daytona Sportbike series, finishing the season with moderate success.

MotoGP World Championship
In 2007 he made his MotoGP debut, at Mazda Raceway Laguna Seca for Pramac d'Antin Ducati, riding a Desmosedici GP7 in replacement for the injured Alex Hofmann, who crashed in first practice. Already there for the supporting AMA round, Davies took over on an unfamiliar bike and track. Despite setting solid laptimes, he was overlooked for the following event at Brno, with Iván Silva replacing Hofmann.

On 28 September 2007 it was announced that Chaz Davies would replace Alex Hoffmann at the D'Antin squad for the final three rounds of the 2007 season. After failing to score in Phillip Island and Sepang, Davies was forced to pull out of the final race of the season in Valencia due to hand and wrist injuries sustained during the qualifying and practice sessions. Davies was offered a full-time testing role with Ducati for 2008, but he turned it down in favour of a return to AMA.

Supersport World Championship
Davies made a switch to World Supersport late in the 2009 season for Triumph, remaining with them for 2010. He was consistently their fastest rider, scoring podium finishes at Valencia, Kyalami and Brno. After his Brno success, team manager Guiliano Rovelli commented "He is a tough bloke who always gives 110% and is now the best rider in Supersport". He came agonisingly close to a first class win at Imola – suffering a fuel pump failure while running third, just as leaders Kenan Sofuoglu and Eugene Laverty collided.

2011 saw Davies team switch to Yamaha machinery. After a disappointing start to his championship campaign with a puncture at the first race, Davies scored 8 podiums with 6 wins on his way to securing the 2011 World Supersport Title.

Superbike World Championship

In 2012 Davies moved to the World Superbike championship to join ParkinGO MTC Racing Aprilia. After a highly impressive debut season he finished 9th overall with 4 podium finishes, including 1 win.

For the 2013 season Davies moved to the factory BMW Motorrad Goldbet team.

For 2015 Davies rode for the Aruba.it Ducati team.

Career statistics

All-time statistics

Grand Prix motorcycle racing

Races by year
(key) (Races in bold indicate pole position, races in italics indicate fastest lap)

AMA Formula Xtreme

Races by year
(key)

AMA Supersport Championship

Races by year
(key)

AMA Pro Daytona SportBike

Races by year
(key)

Supersport World Championship

Races by year
(key) (Races in bold indicate pole position; races in italics indicate fastest lap)

Superbike World Championship

Races by year
(key) (Races in bold indicate pole position) (Races in italics indicate fastest lap)

* Season still in progress.

References

External links

1987 births
Living people
People from Radnorshire
Sportspeople from Powys
People educated at John Beddoes School
British motorcycle racers
Welsh motorcycle racers
Sport in Powys
250cc World Championship riders
Pramac Racing MotoGP riders
Supersport World Championship riders
Superbike World Championship riders
Audi Sport TT Cup drivers
MotoGP World Championship riders